Dinhard railway station is a railway station in the Swiss canton of Zurich and municipality of Dinhard. The station is located on the Winterthur to Etzwilen line and is served by Zurich S-Bahn line S29, which links Winterthur and Stein am Rhein.

References

External links

Dinhard
Dinhard